The octet is a unit of digital information in computing and telecommunications that consists of eight bits. The term is often used when the term byte might be ambiguous, as the byte has historically been used for storage units of a variety of sizes.

The term octad(e) for eight bits is no longer common.

Definition
The international standard IEC 60027-2, chapter 3.8.2, states that a byte is an octet of bits. However, the unit byte has historically been platform-dependent and has represented various storage sizes in the history of computing. Due to the influence of several major computer architectures and product lines, the byte became overwhelmingly associated with eight bits. This meaning of byte is codified in such standards as ISO/IEC 80000-13. While byte and octet are often used synonymously, those working with certain legacy systems are careful to avoid ambiguity.

Octets can be represented using number systems of varying bases such as the hexadecimal, decimal, or octal number systems. One octet can be used to represent decimal values ranging from 0 to 255.

The term octet (symbol: o) is often used when the use of byte might be ambiguous. It is frequently used in the Request for Comments (RFC) publications of the Internet Engineering Task Force to describe storage sizes of network protocol parameters. In 2000, Bob Bemer claimed to have earlier proposed the usage of the term octet for "8-bit bytes" when he headed software operations for Cie. Bull in France in 1965 to 1966.

In France, French Canada and Romania, octet is used in common language instead of byte when the eight-bit sense is required; for example, a megabyte (MB) is termed a megaoctet (Mo).

A variable-length sequence of octets, as in Abstract Syntax Notation One (ASN.1), is referred to as an octet string.

Octad 
Historically, in Western Europe, the term octad (or octade) was used to specifically denote eight bits, a usage no longer common. Early examples of usage exist in British, Dutch and German sources of the 1960s and 1970s, and throughout the documentation of Philips mainframe computers. Similar terms are triad for a grouping of three bits and decade for ten bits.

Unit multiples
Unit multiples of the octet may be formed with SI prefixes and binary prefixes (power of 2 prefixes) as standardized by the International Electrotechnical Commission in 1998.

Use in Internet Protocol addresses
The octet is used in representations of Internet Protocol computer network addresses.
An IPv4 address consists of four octets, usually displayed individually as a series of decimal values ranging from 0 to 255, each separated by a full stop (dot).

See also
 Variable-width encoding

Notes

References

External links

Units of information